Petróleos del Norte S.A. (Petronor) is a Spanish oil and gas company based in Muskiz, Basque Country. The company was established on 30 November 1968. From 1976 to 1981 its executive manager was Nemesio Fernández-Cuesta.

It is owned by Repsol (85.98%) and Kutxabank (14.02%).

References

External links

Oil companies of Spain
Oil pipeline companies
Automotive fuel retailers
Chemical companies of Spain
Basque companies
Energy companies established in 1968
Non-renewable resource companies established in 1968
Economy of the Basque Country (autonomous community)
Spanish brands
Spanish companies established in 1968
Biscay